The Main Ingredient is the second album by Pete Rock & CL Smooth, released on November 8, 1994. It is the duo's last studio album to date.

Music 
Characterized by sultry soul and jazz samples, The Main Ingredient saw a more polished sound than the duo's debut, building on the praise that they had already garnered. The album is notable for its snappy, crispy drums and extensive use of vocal scratches, usually from songs by Biz Markie. Although missing a centerpiece on the scale of "They Reminisce Over You (T.R.O.Y.)", the album contains some of the duo's best known work, in the form of tracks such as the upbeat "In The House", and the catchy "Sun Won't Come Out", which features a lush vocal sample from the song of the same name by Harvey Scales.

Continuing a theme initiated by Mecca and the Soul Brother, brief instrumental interludes are placed at the beginning and end of songs. With the exception of just a few tracks, this feature is recurrent throughout the album. In addition, The Main Ingredient saw Rock fleshing out and defining his trademark production style, which is now recognized for often containing smooth basslines, swirling horns, filtered samples, and spacious grooves. The production on this album proved to be influential upon a legion of latter day producers.

Reception 

Though overlooked at the time of its release, the album has since been re-evaluated with high critical acclaim. AllMusic's Stanton Swihart called it "an album that is far more focused" and "just as good as the first record, perhaps an even more satisfying single listen." Swihart described Rock's production work as "among some of the most seductive in hip-hop", and CL as "lyrically on point, spitting out intellectual rhymes and narratives that are just as propulsive and engaging as the music."

"I Got A Love" was the album's lead off single, followed by "Take You There" and "Searching", released in 1995. That same year, the duo appeared in a well received Sprite commercial; however, they soon announced their breaking up citing creative differences, although both parties have since admitted that an unstable working relationship was the main cause of their split. The album was a favorite of the late producer J Dilla, who played it while meeting with Pete Rock to record Slum Village's "Once Upon A Time" for the album, Fantastic, Vol. 2 in 1998.

Track listing 
All tracks produced by Pete Rock & CL Smooth

Album singles

Chart history

Album

Singles

References

Bibliography 

1994 albums
Pete Rock & CL Smooth albums
Elektra Records albums
Albums produced by Pete Rock
Albums recorded at Greene St. Recording